is a Japanese actor.

Career
In 1999, he won the Japanese Academy Award for Best Actor for his performance in Dr. Akagi. He also won the award for best supporting actor at the 7th Hochi Film Award for Dotonbori River and Hearts and Flowers for Tora-san.

Personal life

His wife is the actress Kazue Tsunogae, and he is the father of the actors Tasuku Emoto and Tokio Emoto.

Selected filmography

Film

Television

Honours
Medal with Purple Ribbon (2011)
Order of the Rising Sun, 4th Class, Gold Rays with Rosette (2019)

References

External links
 
 

1948 births
People from Chūō, Tokyo
Living people
Japanese male film actors
Japanese male television actors
Male actors from Tokyo
Recipients of the Medal with Purple Ribbon
Recipients of the Order of the Rising Sun, 4th class
20th-century Japanese male actors
21st-century Japanese male actors